Han Chae-rin (born 2 September 1996) is a South Korean footballer who plays as a midfielder for Seoul City WFC in the WK League and the South Korea national team.

Club career
On 27 December 2017, Han was drafted fourth overall in the 2018 WK League Draft by Incheon Hyundai Steel Red Angels. On 23 April 2018, she made her debut in a 0–0 draw with Gyeongju KHNP. On 25 May 2018, she scored her first goal in a 6–2 win again Suwon UDC.

International career
Han was selected in the squad for the 2016 FIFA U-20 Women's World Cup in Papua New Guinea, where she scored against Venezuela. On 19 October 2017, she scored on her senior debut, in a 3–1 loss to the United States.

International goals
Scores and results list South Korea's goal tally first.

References

External links
 
 Han Chae-rin at Soccerway

1996 births
Living people
South Korean women's footballers
South Korea women's under-20 international footballers
South Korea women's international footballers
Women's association football midfielders
Footballers at the 2018 Asian Games
Asian Games bronze medalists for South Korea
Asian Games medalists in football
Medalists at the 2018 Asian Games
Incheon Hyundai Steel Red Angels WFC players
WK League players
Competitors at the 2019 Summer Universiade